The Jordanian Northern Command (Arabic:المنطقة العسكرية الشمالية) is the Jordanian Armed Forces regional command responsible for the defense of the northern front against possible attack by Syria or Israel.

History 
The Northern Command was formed in 1977 as part of a major reorganization of the Royal Jordanian Army. The Units that make up the command were transferred from the 12th Mechanized Division that was disbanded. Northern Command units are deployed from Ramtha through Umm Qays to the Zarqa River in a defensive posture that cover both Israel and Syria.

In 2000, King Abdullah II initiated a further re-organization and restructuring of the Jordanian Armed Forces, with the divisions being transformed into lighter, more mobile forces, based largely on a brigade structure and considered better capable of rapid reaction in emergencies.

The 12th Mechanised Division was normally deployed facing west (towards Israel) and north (towards Syria) from the Zarqa river, around Umm Qais, to Ramtha. The western part of Jordan's frontier with Syria is a deep gorge along the Yarmuk River, but there is flatter ground further to the east where an attack could take place; Jordanian forces traditionally maintained a defensive posture along this sector.

Jordanian forces have not been deployed in the Jordan Valley itself, where they would be vulnerable to Israeli air power and artillery. They were deployed on the heights above the valley in positions that enable them to obstruct any enemy movement up the routes to the central plateau leading to the main cities. There are a number of surfaced roads leading up to the top of the escarpment, about
800 to 1,200 m above the floor of the valley, but a well-entrenched force could ensure that any enemy advance up those roads could only be attempted at great cost.

This command was involved in many wars, including the 1948 Arab–Israeli War, the Six-Day War, the War of Attrition and the war against the Syrian army when it tried to enter Jordan in the Black September conflict.

Organisation 
The Northern Command commands regional units from Um Qais in Irbid to the Zarqa River south of Jerash, with a presence in Ar Ramtha. Brigadier General Khaled Al-Masaeid was appointed commander of the Northern Command.

Northern Command HQ 

 Command Staff
 HQ Defense Company
 Command Communication Group
 Command Military Police

Border Guard Force (BGF) 

 2nd Border Guard Force Brigade
 Brigade HQ
 Command Staff
 Signal Company 
 Medical Center
 Vehicles & Weapons Maintenance Workshop
 Reconnaissance & Surveillance Center 
 9th Border Guard Force Battalion
 10th Border Guard Force Battalion
 11th Border Guard Force Battalion
 12th Border Guard Force Battalion

Combat & Maneuver Units 
 King Talal 3rd Mechanized Infantry Brigade
 Brigade HQ
 Command Staff
 Joint Fires Coordination Cell - Targeting Cell
 Signal Company
 Medical Center 
 Vehicles & Weapons Maintenance Workshop
 Chemical Support Platoon (Attached)
 JTAC Team
 Prince Hassan 4th Mechanized Infantry Battalion (YPR-765 pri)
 Imam Ali 8th Mechanized Infantry Battalion (M113A2 MK1)
Prince Ghazi 18th Tank Battalion (M60A3)
 16th Field Artillery Battalion (M109A3)
51st Field Air Defense Battalion (Shilka,Strela-10,Igla)
 Anti-Armor Company (Kornet-E)

 Al-Yarmouk 12th Mechanized Infantry Brigade
 Brigade HQ
 Command Staff
 Joint Fires Coordination Cell - Targeting Cell
 Signal Company
 Medical Center 
 Vehicles & Weapons Maintenance Workshop
 Chemical Support Platoon (Attached)
 JTAC Team
 Abu Obeida Al-Jarrah 24th Mechanized Infantry Battalion (YPR-765 pri)
 Sharhabeel Ibn Hasna 26th Tank Battalion (M60A3)
 Omar Ibn El-A'as 28th Mechanized Infantry Battalion (M113A2 MK1)
 3rd Field Artillery Battalion (M109A3)
 52nd Field Air Defense Battalion (Shilka,Strela-10,Igla) [1]
 Anti-Armor Company (M901 ITV)

 Princess Aliyah 48th Mechanized Infantry Brigade
 Brigade HQ
 Command Staff
 Joint Fires Coordination Cell - Targeting Cell
 Signal Company
 Medical Center 
 Vehicles & Weapons Maintenance Workshop
 Chemical Support Platoon (Attached)
 JTAC Team
 King Abdullah 7th Mechanized Infantry Battalion (M113A2 MK1)
 King Mohammad V 14th Mechanized Infantry Battalion (YPR-765 pri)
 Ja'far bin Abi Talib 39th Mechanized Infantry Battalion (M113A2 MK1)
 32nd Field Artillery Battalion (M109A3)
 52nd Field Air Defense Battalion (Shilka,Strela-10,Igla) [1] 
 Anti-Armor Company (Kornet-E)

Combat Support Units 
 Northern Command Artillery [2]
 Command Artillery HQ
 STA Company
 Prince Hamzeh 6th Heavy Artillery Battalion (M110A2)
 12th Field Air Defense Group [2]
 Group HQ
 Signal Company
 Command Engineer Battalion
 4 Mechanized Engineer Companies [3]
 General Support Company

Service Support Units 
 Supply and Transport Battalion
 4 Supply & Transport Companies [3]
 Command Maintenance Group
 Medical Support Group 
 Administrative Transport Group

Command Training Center 
Notes:
  52nd AD battalion supports two mechanized brigades
  Subordinate battalions attached to combat brigades
  Each company supports a brigade

Unit Summary

References 

Military of Jordan